South Carolina Educational Television (branded as South Carolina ETV, SCETV or simply ETV) is a state network of Public Broadcasting Service (PBS) member television stations serving the U.S. state of South Carolina. It is owned and operated by the South Carolina Educational Television Commission, an agency of the state government which holds the licenses for all of the PBS member stations licensed in the state. The broadcast signals of the eleven television stations cover almost all of the state, as well as parts of North Carolina and Georgia.

The network's primary operations are located on George Rogers Boulevard in Columbia, across from Williams-Brice Stadium on the campus of the University of South Carolina; SCETV operates satellite studios in Spartanburg, Sumter and Rock Hill.

History
 
The state network began in 1957, after the South Carolina General Assembly authorized a study in the use of instructional television in the state's public schools. A studio was opened in the library of Dreher High School in Columbia, South Carolina. The first telecourses (a French course taught by Madame Lucille Turney-High and a geometry course taught by Cornelia Turnbull) aired on September 8, 1958 via closed circuit television. By action of the South Carolina General Assembly, The South Carolina ETV Commission was created as a state agency and began operations on July 1, 1960, and by 1962 it extended closed-circuit, classroom television service to all 46 South Carolina counties.

In 1963, the Commission launched the first open-circuit (broadcast) educational station in South Carolina, WNTV in Greenville. One year later, WITV in Charleston signed on. Two years later, WRLK-TV in Columbia, made its debut. The network grew to eleven television transmitters covering all of the state. After years of receiving NET and PBS programs on tape delay, it entered PBS' satellite network in 1978. In 2000, SCETV broadcast the first digital television program in the state. Since 2003, the state network identifies on-air as simply "ETV."

The Commission entered public radio in 1972, when WEPR in Clemson signed on the air (WEPR later moved its city of license to Greenville). The state radio network eventually expanded to eight stations and was called the South Carolina Educational Radio Network (SCERN) until 2003, when it was renamed ETV Radio. While "ETV" generally refers to television, SCETV viewed "ETV" as a general brand name for both its radio and television properties. In 2015, however, the radio network rebranded as South Carolina Public Radio.

R. Lynn Kalmbach was selected as the network's project director in 1958 and led it until his death in 1965. Henry J. Cauthen became ETV's president and general manager and served in numerous leadership roles developing American public broadcasting, including chair of the Corporation for Public Broadcasting (CPB). Cauthen retired in 1997. Paul Amos took the helm as ETV's third president in 1998 until his death in 2000. Maurice "Moss" Bresnahan joined ETV as president and CEO from 2001 to 2008. David Crouch served as interim president in 2009. Linda O'Bryon served as president from 2010 to 2017. Anthony Padgett is the current president and CEO.

Digital TV era
Despite the DTV Delay Act national transition extension to June 12, 2009, SCETV discontinued the analog signals of its 11 full-power stations February 18, 2009.

Each station's post-transition digital allocations and the FCC Repack Plan (2017) are as follows:

On April 13, 2017, the FCC identified SCETV will be compensated $43.2 million to have WRET-TV go off-the-air as part of the Spectrum auction. WRET will relinquish RF 43 and go into a channel sharing arrangement with WNTV, starting on January 23, 2018. On August 30, 2017, PBS Kids was added on new subchannel .4 and online.

On October 31, 2017, SCETV submitted an application to change the digital terrestrial signal of WITV from channel 7 (VHF) to channel 24 (UHF); the changeover was scheduled to take place between May and July 2020.

Commission
There are nine members of the ETV Commission. Eight are appointed by the Governor for six-year terms—one from each Congressional District and one from the State at-large who serves as Chairman. The ninth member is the State Superintendent of Education who is ex-officio.

Network 
SCETV's television network consists of 11 digital transmitters that cover almost all of South Carolina, as well as eastern portions of Georgia (including Augusta and Savannah) and southern portions of North Carolina (including Charlotte and Asheville). SCETV's headquarters and main production facility is located in Columbia, with production facilities in Rock Hill, Spartanburg and Sumter.

Regional television stations
SCETV initially planned to make all eleven of its television stations capable of airing local programming. Four full-fledged stations were built and staffed in Beaufort, Rock Hill, Spartanburg and Sumter before the idea was abandoned in the early 1980s. After a massive reduction in force in 2004, the stations were downgraded to production facilities. In 2012, WJWJ-TV in Beaufort was converted into a repeater of the network.

The original plan was for each station to carry callsigns of the form WxTV, but after WNTV and WITV signed on it was determined that there were not enough such callsigns available. Beginning with the third station, WRLK-TV in Columbia, most of the remaining callsigns represent prominent officials who either supported SCETV or represented the station's coverage area.

Many of the stations have call signs named after former elected officials in the state. WRLK-TV was named after R. Lynn Kalmbach, the first general manager of ETV Commission, while WRET-TV was named for Richard E. Tukey, the director of Spartanburg County's Chamber of Commerce from 1951 to 1979. WJPM-TV, WJWJ-TV and WRJA-TV were all named after state legislators: WEBA-TV for Edgar Brown, WJPM-TV for James Pierce Mozingo III, WJWJ-TV for James M. Waddell, Jr. and WRJA-TV for R. J. Aycock.

WHMC used the callsign WIIB before sign-on. WJWJ-TV (branded as "ETV Lowcountry") previously maintained a regional production facility which was closed down in 2012. WNSC-TV (branded as "ETV Carolinas"), WRET-TV (branded as "ETV Upstate"), and WRJA-TV (branded as "ETV Sumter") are regional production facilities. The other six transmitters are full-time relays of WRLK (branded as "ETV Headquarters"). WRET-TV used the callsign WRTS-TV before sign-on.

Digital television
SCETV offers four digital television services available over-the-air, and through the digital tiers of some cable television providers. ETV HD is the primary feed with high definition content from PBS and SCETV broadcast in the 1080i resolution format. The South Carolina Channel (SCC) carries the national Create service daily, with regionally produced documentary programs focusing on the Carolinas airing during the evening hours. ETV World (ETVW) provides live newscasts from Europe, notably from Germany's Deutsche Welle and the United Kingdom's BBC television networks, along with live coverage from the South Carolina State House. SCETV PBS Kids is the fourth channel, a 24/7 service also available online. SCC, ETVW and ETVK are transmitted in 480i standard definition.

Cable and satellite availability
SCETV's television network is carried on nearly every cable television provider in South Carolina. Additionally, Rock Hill's WNSC-TV is carried on Charter Spectrum's systems on the North Carolina side of the Charlotte market.

On DirecTV and Dish Network, WRLK-TV, WNTV, WITV, WNSC-TV, WJWJ-TV, WEBA-TV and WJPM-TV are respectively carried on the Columbia, Greenville/Spartanburg/Asheville, Charleston, Charlotte, Savannah, Augusta and Florence/Myrtle Beach local feeds. The South Carolina Channel, ETV World and SCETV PBS Kids have yet to be offered by satellite services.

Logos

SCETV original programming (current and past)

Television programming
By the River
Carolina Business Review (in conjunction with UNC-TV and WTVI in Charlotte)
Carolina Classrooms 
A Chef's Life (with Markay Media, Peabody 2013), Emmy for Outstanding Directing Lifestyle/Culinary/Travel, 2014)
ETV Classics
Expeditions with Patrick McMillan 
For Your Home
Live at the Charleston Music Hall
Live coverage of the South Carolina State House
Making it Grow 
Palmetto Scene 
Reel South (in conjunction with UNC-TV and The Southern Documentary Fund) 
This Week in South Carolina https://www.scetv.org/watch/this-week-south-carolina
Historical: (partial)

Action Packed Cliffhangers (1980s series on the serials from the golden age of cinemas)
American Playhouse: Roanoak (mini-series, 1986) PBS
At Home Southern Style
Carolina Journal
Crucible of Empire: The Spanish American War (1999) Great Projects Film Company Inc. for PBS
The Day the Universe Changed (BBC series, presented by SCETV in the U.S., 1986) PBS
The Dooley and Pals Show (SCETV distributed the secular version of this children's series to PBS stations)
Enemies of War (2001) ITVS / PBS
Firing Line (produced by SCETV for PBS from 1971 to 1999)
Germans in America (four-part history series 2008) public TV (syndicated)
Great Performances: The Consul (opera, 1977) PBS
Great Performances: Vanessa (opera, 1978) PBS
Great Projects: The Building of America (2002) Great Projects Film Company Inc. for PBS
Jobman Caravan
The Magic School Bus (Animated Nelvana/Ellipse production based on the children's book series; presented by SCETV and aired on PBS from 1994–1998), later moved to the Fox network.
Mary Long's Yesteryear (Mary Long died in 1998, but reruns continue on The South Carolina Channel)
NatureScene (nature walk series with hosts Rudy Mancke and Jim Welch, videography by Allen Sharpe, 1978–2003) syndicated, public television 
Palmetto Places
Piedmont Quiz Bowl - 1980s and 1990s (WRET-TV in Spartanburg)
Primary Colors: The Story of Corita (documentary on Corita Kent, 1990) PBS 
Priscilla's Yoga Stretches
Profile
Ralph Bunche: An American Odyssey (2001) Schomburg Center for Research in Black Culture/William Greaves/PBS
Stateline
Sandlapper's Corner (Late 1970s children's educational show focused on South Carolina culture and history)
Six Gun Heroes (1980s series on the western stars from the golden age of cinema)
Studio See (SCETV's magazine-style children's show, seen nationwide on PBS in the late 1970s and early 1980s)
Under The Blue Umbrella (In-school program from the 1970s that dealt with a single-subject; nationally syndicated to PBS stations)
Under The Yellow Balloon (Similar to Blue Umbrella; from the early 1980s)
Voices and Visions (13-part poetry series, 2004) PBS

References

External links 

 
Television stations in South Carolina
PBS member networks
Educational and instructional television channels
1963 establishments in South Carolina